"The Correlation between Relatives on the Supposition of Mendelian Inheritance" is a scientific paper by Ronald Fisher which was published in the Transactions of the Royal Society of Edinburgh in 1918, (volume 52, pages 399–433).  In it, Fisher puts forward the "infinitesimal model", a genetics conceptual model showing that continuous variation amongst phenotypic traits could be the result of Mendelian inheritance. The paper also contains the first use of the statistical term variance.

Background 

Mendelian inheritance was rediscovered in 1900.  However, there were differences of opinion as to the variation that natural selection acted upon.  The biometric school, led by Karl Pearson followed Charles Darwin's idea that small differences were important for evolution.  The Mendelian school, led by William Bateson, however thought that Gregor Mendel's work gave an evolutionary mechanism with large differences. Joan Box, Fisher's biographer and daughter states in her 1978 book, The Life of a Scientist that Fisher, then a student, had resolved this problem in 1911.

Fisher had originally submitted his paper (then entitled "The correlation to be expected between relatives on the supposition of Mendelian inheritance") to the Royal Society of London, to be published in their Transactions.  The two referees, the biologist R. C. Punnett and the statistician Karl Pearson, believed that the paper contained areas they were unable to judge, due to lack of expertise, and expressed some reservations. Though the paper was not rejected, Fisher carried on a feud with Pearson from 1917 onwards, and instead sent the paper via J. Arthur Thomson to the Royal Society of Edinburgh, which published it in its Transactions.

Model 

Fisher defined his new term variance, as the square of the standard deviation, because of the manner in which variances of independent random variables may be added. He noted the continuous variation in human characters.

References

Notes 
 Box, Joan Fisher (1978) R. A. Fisher: The Life of a Scientist, New York: Wiley, .
 Fisher, R.A.  Collected Papers of R.A. Fisher (1971–1974). Five Volumes. University of Adelaide.
 Moran, PAP and Smith, C.A.B. (1966) "Commentary on R.A. Fisher's paper 'On the Correlation Between Relatives On the Supposition of Mendelian Inheritance'". Eugenics Laboratory Memoirs XLI pp62 (Cambridge University Press)

External links 
The University of Adelaide has made the original available in pdf format: 

Biology papers
Evolutionary biology literature
Genetics in the United Kingdom
History of genetics
History of probability and statistics
Royal Society of Edinburgh
1918 documents
1918 in biology
Works originally published in British magazines
Works originally published in science and technology magazines